Thangjam Dhabali Singh (or Dhabali Singh Thangjam) is an Indian pathologist, entrepreneur and the chairman and managing director of BABINA Healthcare and Hospitality Industries Pvt Ltd, a company based in Imphal, Manipur with business activities in healthcare and hospitality industry. The government of Japan conferred to him the Order of the Rising Sun, Gold and Silver Rays 2020 for his work on the promotion of ties between India and Japan.

Biography 

Thangjam Dhabali Singh was born in Imphal on 1 January 1956 in a business family. After obtaining his MBBS degree from Regional Institute of Medical Sciences, Imphal (formerly Regional Medical College), he secured his post graduate degree in pathology from Post Graduate Institute of Medical Education and Research (PGIMER), Chandigarh in 1982. In 1983, he went back to his home state, Manipur and set up BABINA Diagnostics, a medical diagnostic centre in Imphal as his first business venture. The following year, he joined Regional Institute of Medical Sciences, Imphal in the Department of Pathology as a teaching faculty member and continued working there until 1994 when he voluntarily retired from service as associate professor. Working as its laboratory director, Dr Thangjam Dhabali Singh is considered to have made BABINA Diagnostics into a modern medical diagnostic centre that provided a range of diagnostic services to the people of Manipur and Northeast India. In 2020, he set up BABINA Specialty Hospital, a cancer hospital in Imphal in collaboration with American Oncology Institute.

Thangjam Dhabali Singh diversified his business activities in hospitality industry after he formed his company, BABINA Healthcare and Hospitality Industries Pvt Ltd in 2007. The company promoted The Classic Hotel in Imphal in 2009, which was the first three-star category hotel in Manipur. It also promoted its second hotel, Classic Grande in 2014 as a member of Radisson Individuals.

Thangjam Dhabali Singh is the founding president of Manipur Tourism Forum (MTF), an organisation that works for the promotion of tourism in Manipur. Manipur Tourism Forum operates The Imphal Peace Museum at Maibam Lokpa Ching, Manipur (also called Red Hills) which is a historical site of World War II with support from Nippon Foundation and Sasakawa Peace Foundation.

Awards 
The 2nd ICC Northeast Excellence Award 2010 awarded by Indian Chamber of Commerce (ICC) in collaboration with Ministry of Development of North Eastern Region (DoNER)

Order of the Rising Sun, Gold and Silver Rays 2020 presented by the government of Japan

References 

Living people
1956 births
Recipients of the Order of the Rising Sun
Indian pathologists
20th-century Indian businesspeople
21st-century Indian businesspeople
People from Imphal
Indian hoteliers